Matthis Harsman (born 4 October 1999) is a German professional footballer who plays as a goalkeeper for  club SV Meppen.

Career
After his career beginnings in the youth department of ASC Grün-Weiß 49 in Wielen, Harsman moved to the academy of SV Meppen in summer 2015. There he was promoted to the first team of the Meppen-based club, competing in the 3. Liga, at the beginning of the 2018–19 season.

On 26 October 2019, he made his professional debut in the 3–3 away draw against Hallescher FC when he came on for Willi Evseev in the 42nd minute of the game, as regular goalkeeper Erik Domaschke had been sent off.

References

External links

Living people
1999 births
German footballers
Footballers from Lower Saxony
Association football goalkeepers
3. Liga players
SV Meppen players